The third season of Hart of Dixie, an American television series, was originally broadcast in the United States on The CW from October 7, 2013, to May 16, 2014. It was produced by CBS Television Studios. Hart of Dixie was renewed for a fourth season on May 8, 2014.

Overview
The season begins with Zoe returning to Bluebell with her new boyfriend (Joel) played by Josh Cooke. George struggles to rebuild his life following his break up with Tansy but finds love with Levon's younger cousin. Lemon finds herself in a scandalous relationship while Annabeth hopes her relationship with Levon will grow into something more. Zoe begins to learn more about her family roots in Bluebell.

Cast and characters

Regular
 Rachel Bilson as Dr. Zoe Hart
 Scott Porter as George Tucker
 Jaime King as Lemon Breeland
 Cress Williams as Lavon Hayes
 Wilson Bethel as  Wade Kinsella
 Kaitlyn Black as Annabeth Nass
 Tim Matheson as Dr. Brick Breeland

Recurring characters
 Josh Cooke as Joel Stephens
 Reginald VelJohnson as Dash DeWitt
 Brandi Burkhardt as Crickett Watts
 Tony Cavalero as Stanley Watts
 McKaley Miller as Rose Hattenbarger
 Claudia Lee as Magnolia Breeland
 Mircea Monroe as Tansy Truitt
 Laura Bell Bundy as Shelby Sinclair
 Armelia McQueen as Shula Whitaker
 Lauren Bittner as Vivian Wilkes
 Cole Sand as Harley Wilkes Jr.
 Barry Watson as Davis Polk
 JoBeth Williams as Candice Hart
 John Marshall Jones as Wally Maynard
 Charlie Robinson as Sergeant Jeffries
 Amy Ferguson as Lily Anne Lonergan
 Karla Mosley as Elodie Baxte
 Maree Cheatham as Bettie Breeland
 Ryan McPartlin as Carter Covington
 Anne Ramsay as Winifred Wilkes
 Ross Philips as Tom Long
 Mallory Moye as Wanda Lewis
 Antoinette Robertson as Lynly Hayes
 Matt Lowe as Meatball
 Steven M. Porter as Frank Moth
 Peter Mackenzie as Reverend Peter Mayfair
 Christopher Curry as Earl Kinsella
 John Eric Bentley as Sheriff Bill
 Alan Autry as Todd Gainey
 Joe Massingill as Cody
 Kim Robillard as Sal
 Esther Scott as Delma Warner
 Carla Renata as Susie
 Reggie Hayes as Don Todd
 Nicole J. Butler as Prizzi Pritchett
 Nakia Burrise as Patty Pritchett
 Megan Ferguson as Daisy
 Lindsey Van Horn as Amy-Rose
 Bayne Gibby as Shanetta
 McKayla Maroney as Tonya
 Aynsley Bubbico as Sadie
 Matt Hobby as Rudy Pruitt
 Bill Parks as Chicken Truitt
 Kevin Sheridan as Rockett Truitt
 Tony Cavalero as Stanley Watts
 Lawrence Pressman as Vernon 'Brando' Wilkes

Special guest star
 Robert Buckley as Peter

Episodes

Production

Development
Hart of Dixie was renewed for a third season on April 26, 2013. and renewed for a fourth season on May 8, 2014.

Casting
On July 26, 2013, TVLine reported that Kaitlyn Black portrayed as Annabeth Nass had been promoted to a series regular in the season. Josh Cooke was cast in a recurring role as Zoe's new boyfriend, Joel Stephens. Ryan McPartlin was guest star as Carter Covington. Robert Buckley was guest cast to portray Peter, and Lauren Bittner was cast as Zoe's cousin, Vivian Wilkes.

Reception
The season premiered to 1.03 million people with a 0.4 rating share for adults 18-49.

Home release
Hart of Dixie: The Complete Third Season was released on DVD in the US on March 15, 2014. The 5 disc set includes all 22 episodes from the third season and various language and subtitle options.

References

2013 American television seasons
2014 American television seasons